Charlotte Spencer (born 26 September 1991) is an English actress, dancer and singer. She is known for playing the female lead in The Living and the Dead. Screen International magazine named her a Star of Tomorrow 2015.

Early and personal life 
Spencer was born on 26 September 1991 in Harlow, Essex, to Peter and Karen. She has a younger sister and brother. Spencer said of her background, "I come from a working class background; my dad's a builder and my mum works in a school." She started ballet aged three and wanted to perform since then. At the age of 11, her parents sent her to the Sylvia Young Theatre School in Marylebone, London. Her parents remortgaged their house to support her acting career. In 2016, she lived with her parents when not working as an actor, and worked with her grandmother at a charity shop and helps with the choir at her mother's infants' school. She has a dog, Chip.

Career

Theatre 

Spencer made her acting debut at the age of 12 as Jane Banks in Richard Eyre's 2004 production of the musical Mary Poppins. In 2009, she played Bet in Oliver!. In 2013, Eyre again cast her, this time as Christine Keeler, in the Andrew Lloyd Webber musical Stephen Ward, with Charlotte Blackledge as Mandy Rice-Davies. The show's run was cancelled shortly afterwards.

Film and television 
Spencer appeared as Dexter Fletcher's daughter in Hotel Babylon. She was the voice of Angelina Ballerina on Angelina Ballerina: The Next Steps when she was 17, and has since worked as a voice actor, as Nettles in the 2018 television series Watership Down and as a continuity announcer for the Disney Channel. She appeared in the films Wild Bill and Les Misérables in 2011 and then Dark Shadows with Johnny Depp in 2012.

After her theatre appearance as Christine Keeler ended, Spencer had a small part in Line of Duty and then was cast by the same director as the jockey Tina Fallon in the 2014 E4 television series Glue. She was nominated for the British Academy Television Award for Best Supporting Actress for this role in 2015. Deadline Hollywood reported that she would star in Broad Squad; in 2015, she appeared in a pilot of Broad Squad as a 1970s police officer on ABC, which was not made into a series. She starred as Niamh in the BFI short, Above, which won Best Short Film at the National Film Awards UK. She played the lead role, Lilly, in the film Bypass with George MacKay and appeared as Ellie in the BBC2 television series Stonemouth. In 2015, she was nominated for best actress awards for Stonemouth at BAFTA Scotland. In the BBC1 horror television series The Living and the Dead, broadcast in June 2016, she played the role of Charlotte Appelby, a photographer turned housewife, with Colin Morgan. She said of the role, "Since I was a child, I've always wanted to do a period drama." She appeared in another period drama in autumn 2019, as Esther Denham in Sanditon, a television adaptation of the unfinished Jane Austen novel. She defended the inclusion of sex and nudity as historically accurate and "humanising".

In May 2016, she filmed the BBC/NFTS short film Diagnosis in the lead role of Sally, a woman who acts in medical role play. Spencer will also play a hapless youth in the teen horror film Gateway, which uses the Momo Challenge as a plot device.

Filmography

Television

Film

References

External links 
 
 
 

1991 births
Living people
21st-century English actresses
21st-century English singers
21st-century English women singers
Actresses from Essex
Alumni of the Sylvia Young Theatre School
English child actresses
English film actresses
English stage actresses
English television actresses
English voice actresses
People from Harlow